The Call of the Wild is a short adventure novel by Jack London, published in 1903 and set in Yukon, Canada, during the 1890s Klondike Gold Rush, when strong sled dogs were in high demand. The central character of the novel is a dog named Buck. The story opens at a ranch in Santa Clara Valley, California, when Buck is stolen from his home and sold into service as a sled dog in Alaska. He becomes progressively more primitive and wild in the harsh environment, where he is forced to fight to survive and dominate other dogs. By the end, he sheds the veneer of civilization, and relies on primordial instinct and learned experience to emerge as a leader in the wild.

London spent almost a year in the Yukon, and his observations form much of the material for the book. The story was serialized in The Saturday Evening Post in the summer of 1903 and was published later that year in book form. The book's great popularity and success made a reputation for London. As early as 1923, the story was adapted to film, and it has since seen several more cinematic adaptations.

Summary of the book 

The story opens in 1897 with Buck, a powerful 140-pound St. Bernard–Scotch Shepherd mix, happily living in California's Santa Clara Valley as the pampered pet of Judge Miller and his family. One night, assistant gardener Manuel, needing money to pay off gambling debts, steals Buck and sells him to a stranger. Buck is shipped to Seattle, where he is confined in a crate, starved, and ill-treated. When released, Buck attacks his handler, the "man in the red sweater" who teaches Buck the "law of club and fang", sufficiently cowing him. The man shows some kindness after Buck demonstrates obedience.

Shortly after, Buck is sold to two French-Canadian dispatchers from the Canadian government, François and Perrault, who take him to Alaska. Buck is trained as a sled dog for the Klondike region of Canada. In addition to Buck, François and Perrault add ten dogs to their team (Spitz, Dolly, Pike, Jo, Billie, Teek, Koona, Dub, Dave, and Sol-leks). Buck's teammates teach him how to survive cold winter nights and about pack society. Over the next several weeks on the trail, a bitter rivalry develops between Buck and the lead dog, Spitz, a vicious and quarrelsome white husky. Buck eventually kills Spitz in a fight and becomes the new lead dog.

When François and Perrault complete the round-trip of the Yukon Trail in record time, returning to Skagway with their dispatches, they are given new orders from the Canadian government. They sell their sled team to a "Scotch half-breed" man, who works in the mail service. The dogs must make long, tiring trips, carrying heavy loads to the mining areas. While running the trail, Buck seems to have memories of a canine ancestor who has a short-legged "hairy man" companion. Meanwhile, the weary animals become weak from the hard labor, and the wheel dog, Dave, a morose husky, becomes terminally sick and is eventually shot.

With the dogs too exhausted and footsore to be of use, the mail carrier sells them to three stampeders from the American Southland (the present-day contiguous United States)—a vain woman named Mercedes, her sheepish husband Charles, and her arrogant brother Hal. They lack survival skills for the Northern wilderness, struggle to control the sled, and ignore others' helpful advice—particularly warnings about the dangerous spring melt. When told her sled is too heavy, Mercedes dumps out crucial supplies in favor of fashion objects. She and Hal foolishly create a team of 14 dogs, believing they will travel faster. The dogs are overfed and overworked, then starved when food runs low. Most of the dogs die on the trail, leaving only Buck and four other dogs when they pull into the White River.

The group meets John Thornton, an experienced outdoorsman, who notices the dogs' poor, weakened condition. The trio ignores Thornton's warnings about crossing the ice and press onward. Exhausted, starving, and sensing the danger ahead, Buck refuses to continue. After Hal whips Buck mercilessly, a disgusted and angry Thornton hits him and cuts Buck free. The group presses onward with the four remaining dogs, but their weight causes the ice to break and the dogs and humans (along with their sled) to fall into the river and drown.

As Thornton nurses Buck back to health, Buck grows to love him. Buck kills a malicious man named Burton by tearing out his throat because Burton hit Thornton while the latter was defending an innocent "tenderfoot." This gives Buck a reputation all over the North. Buck also saves Thornton when he falls into a river. After Thornton takes him on trips to pan for gold, a bonanza king (someone who struck it rich in the goldfields) named Mr. Matthewson wagers Thornton on Buck's strength and devotion. Buck pulls a sled with a half-ton load of flour, breaking it free from the frozen ground, dragging it  and winning Thornton US$1,600 in gold dust. A "king of the Skookum Benches" offers a large sum (US$700 at first, then $1,200) to buy Buck, but Thornton declines and tells him to go to hell. 

Using his winnings, Thornton pays his debts but elects to continue searching for gold with partners Pete and Hans, sledding Buck and six other dogs to search for a fabled Lost Cabin. Once they locate a suitable gold find, the dogs find they have nothing to do. Buck has more ancestor memories of being with the primitive "hairy man." While Thornton and his two friends pan gold, Buck hears the call of the wild, explores the wilderness, and socializes with a northwestern wolf from a local pack. However, Buck does not join the wolves and returns to Thornton. Buck repeatedly goes back and forth between Thornton and the wild, unsure of where he belongs. Returning to the campsite one day, he finds Hans, Pete, and Thornton along with their dogs have been murdered by Native American Yeehats. Enraged, Buck kills several Natives to avenge Thornton, then realizes he no longer has any human ties left. He goes looking for his wild brother and encounters a hostile wolf pack. He fights them and wins, then discovers that the lone wolf he had socialized with is a pack member. Buck follows the pack into the forest and answers the call of the wild.

The legend of Buck spreads among other Native Americans as the "Ghost Dog" of the Northland (Alaska and northwestern Canada). Each year, on the anniversary of his attack on the Yeehats, Buck returns to the former campsite where he was last with Thornton, Hans, and Pete, to mourn their deaths. Every winter, leading the wolf pack, Buck wreaks vengeance on the Yeehats "as he sings a song of the younger world, which is the song of the pack."

Main characters
Major dog characters:
Buck, the novel's protagonist; a 140-pound St. Bernard–Scotch Collie mix who lived contentedly in California with Judge Miller. However, he was stolen and sold to the Klondike by the gardener's assistant Manuel and was forced to work as a sled dog in the harsh Yukon. He eventually finds a loving master named John Thornton and gradually grows feral as he adapts to the wilderness, eventually joining a wolf pack. After Thornton's death, he is free of humans forever and becomes a legend in the Klondike.
Spitz, the novel's initial antagonist and Buck's arch-rival; a white-haired husky from Spitsbergen who had accompanied a geological survey into the Canadian Barrens. He has a long career as a sled dog leader, and sees Buck's uncharacteristic ability, for a Southland dog, to adapt and thrive in the North as a threat to his dominance. He repeatedly provokes fights with Buck, who bides his time.
Dave, the 'wheel dog' at the back end of the dog team. He is brought North with Buck and Spitz and is a faithful sled dog who only wants to be left alone and led by an effective lead dog. During his second down-trek on the Yukon Trail, he grows mortally weak, but the men accommodate his pride by allowing him to continue to drive the sled until he becomes so weak that he is euthanized.
Curly, a large Newfoundland dog who was murdered and eaten by native huskies.
Billee, a good-natured, appeasing husky who faithfully pulls the sled until being worked to death by Hal, Charles, and Mercedes.
Dolly, a strong husky purchased in Dyea, Alaska by Francois and Perrault. Dolly is badly hurt after an attack by wild dogs, and she later goes rabid herself, furiously attacking the other sled dogs including Buck, until her skull is smashed in by Francois as he struggles to stop her madness.
Joe, Billee's brother, but with an opposite personality— sour and introspective. Spitz is unable to discipline him, but Buck, after rising to the head of the team, brings him into line.
 Sol-leks ('The Angry One'), a one-eyed husky who does not like being approached from his blind side. Like Dave, he expects nothing, gives nothing, and only cares about being left alone and having an effective lead dog.
Pike, a clever malingerer and thief
Dub, an awkward blunderer, always getting caught
Teek and Koona, additional huskies on the Yukon Trail dog-team
Skeet and Nig, two Southland dogs owned by John Thornton when he acquires Buck
 The Wild Brother, a lone wolf who befriends Buck

Major human characters:
Judge Miller, Buck's first master who lived in Santa Clara Valley, California with his family. Unlike Thornton, he only expressed friendship with Buck, whereas Thornton expressed love.
Manuel, Judge Miller's employee who sells Buck to the Klondike to pay off his gambling debts.
The Man in the Red Sweater, a trainer who beats Buck to teach him the law of the club.
Perrault, a "swarthy" French-Canadian, courier for the Canadian government who is Buck's first Northland master.
François, a French-Canadian "half-breed", "and twice as swarthy" and Perrault's partner, the musher who drives the sled dogs.
Hal, an aggressive and violent musher who is Mercedes' brother and Charles' brother-in-law; he is inexperienced with handling sled dogs.
Charles, Mercedes' husband, who is less violent than Hal.
Mercedes, a spoiled and pampered woman who is Hal's sister and Charles' wife.
John Thornton, a gold hunter who is Buck's final master until he is killed by the Yeehats.
Pete and Hans, John Thornton's two partners as he pans for gold in the East.
The Yeehats, a tribe of Native Americans. After they kill John Thornton, Buck attacks them, and eternally 'dogs' them after going wild—assuring they never re-enter the valley where his last master was murdered.

Background 

California native Jack London had traveled around the United States as a hobo, returned to California to finish high school (he dropped out at age 14), and spent a year in college at Berkeley, when in 1897 he went to the Klondike by way of Alaska during the height of the Klondike Gold Rush. Later, he said of the experience: "It was in the Klondike I found myself."

He left California in July and traveled by boat to Dyea, Alaska, where he landed and went inland. They were successful in staking claims to eight gold mines along the Stewart River.

London stayed in the Klondike for almost a year, living temporarily in the frontier town of Dawson City, before moving to a nearby winter camp, where he spent the winter in a temporary shelter reading books he had brought: Charles Darwin's On the Origin of Species and John Milton's Paradise Lost. In the winter of 1898, Dawson City was a city comprising about 30,000 miners, a saloon, an opera house, and a street of brothels.

In the spring, as the annual gold stampeders began to stream in, London left. He had contracted scurvy, common in the Arctic winters where fresh produce was unavailable. When his gums began to swell he decided to return to California. With his companions, he rafted  down the Yukon River, through portions of the wildest territory in the region, until they reached St. Michael. There, he hired himself out on a boat to earn return passage to San Francisco.

In Alaska, London found the material that inspired him to write The Call of the Wild.  Dyea Beach was the primary point of arrival for miners when London traveled through there, but because its access was treacherous Skagway soon became the new arrival point for prospectors. To reach the Klondike, miners had to navigate White Pass, known as "Dead Horse Pass", where horse carcasses littered the route because they could not survive the harsh and steep ascent. Horses were replaced with dogs as pack animals to transport material over the pass;  particularly strong dogs with thick fur were "much desired, scarce and high in price".

London would have seen many dogs, especially prized husky sled dogs, in Dawson City and the winter camps situated close to the main sled route. He was friends with Marshall Latham Bond and his brother Louis Whitford Bond, the owners of a mixed St. Bernard-Scotch Collie dog about which London later wrote: "Yes, Buck is based on your dog at Dawson." Beinecke Library at Yale University holds a photograph of Bond's dog, taken during London's stay in the Klondike in 1897. The depiction of the California ranch at the beginning of the story was based on the Bond family ranch.

Publication history 
On his return to California, London was unable to find work and relied on odd jobs such as cutting grass. He submitted a query letter to the San Francisco Bulletin proposing a story about his Alaskan adventure, but the idea was rejected because, as the editor told him, "Interest in Alaska has subsided to an amazing degree." A few years later, London wrote a short story about a dog named Bâtard who, at the end of the story, kills his master. London sold the piece to Cosmopolitan Magazine, which published it in the June 1902 issue under the title "Diablo – A Dog". London's biographer, Earle Labor, says that London then began work on The Call of the Wild to "redeem the species" from his dark characterization of dogs in "Bâtard". Expecting to write a short story, London explains: "I meant it to be a companion to my other dog story 'Bâtard' ... but it got away from me, and instead of 4,000 words it ran 32,000 before I could call a halt."

Written as a frontier story about the gold rush, The Call of the Wild was meant for the pulp market. It was first published in four installments in The Saturday Evening Post, which bought it for $750 in 1903. In the same year, London sold all rights to the story to Macmillan, which published it in book format. The book has never been out of print since that time.

Editions 
 The first edition, by Macmillan, released in August 1903, had 10 tipped-in color plates by illustrators Philip R. Goodwin and Charles Livingston Bull, and a color frontispiece by Charles Edward Hooper; it sold for $1.50. It is presently available with the original illustrations at the Internet Archive.

Genre 

The Call of the Wild falls into the categories of adventure fiction and what is sometimes referred to as the animal story genre, in which an author attempts to write an animal protagonist without resorting to anthropomorphism. At the time, London was criticized for attributing "unnatural" human thoughts and insights to a dog, so much so that he was accused of being a nature faker. London himself dismissed these criticisms as "homocentric" and "amateur". London further responded that he had set out to portray nature more accurately than his predecessors. 

 

Along with his contemporaries Frank Norris and Theodore Dreiser, London was influenced by the naturalism of European writers such as Émile Zola, in which themes such as heredity versus environment were explored. London's use of the genre gave it a new vibrancy, according to scholar Richard Lehan. 

The story is also an example of American pastoralism—a prevailing theme in American literature—in which the mythic hero returns to nature. As with other characters of American literature, such as Rip van Winkle and Huckleberry Finn, Buck symbolizes a reaction against industrialization and social convention with a return to nature. London presents the motif simply, clearly, and powerfully in the story, a motif later echoed by 20th-century American writers William Faulkner and Ernest Hemingway (most notably in "Big Two-Hearted River"). E.L. Doctorow says of the story that it is "fervently American".

The enduring appeal of the story, according to American literature scholar Donald Pizer, is that it is a combination of allegory, parable, and fable. The story incorporates elements of age-old animal fables, such as Aesop's Fables, in which animals speak the truth, and traditional beast fables, in which the beast "substitutes wit for insight". London was influenced by Rudyard Kipling's The Jungle Book, written a few years earlier, with its combination of parable and animal fable, and by other animal stories popular in the early 20th century. In The Call of the Wild, London intensifies and adds layers of meaning that are lacking in these stories.

As a writer, London tended to skimp on form, according to biographer Labor, and neither The Call of the Wild nor White Fang "is a conventional novel". The story follows the archetypal "myth of the hero"; Buck, who is the hero, takes a journey, is transformed, and achieves an apotheosis. The format of the story is divided into four distinct parts, according to Labor. In the first part, Buck experiences violence and struggles for survival; in the second part, he proves himself a leader of the pack; the third part brings him to his death (symbolically and almost literally); and in the fourth and final part, he undergoes rebirth.

Themes 

London's story is a tale of survival and a return to primitivism. Pizer writes that: "the strong, the shrewd, and the cunning shall prevail when ...life is bestial".

Pizer also finds evidence in the story of a Christian theme of love and redemption, as shown by Buck's refusal to revert to violence until after the death of Thornton, who had won Buck's love and loyalty. London, who went so far as to fight for custody of one of his own dogs, understood that loyalty between dogs (particularly working dogs) and their masters is built on trust and love.

Writing in the "Introduction" to the Modern Library edition of The Call of the Wild, E. L. Doctorow says the theme is based on Darwin's the concept of survival of the fittest. London places Buck in conflict with humans, in conflict with the other dogs, and in conflict with his environment—all of which he must challenge, survive, and conquer. Buck, a domesticated dog, must call on his atavistic hereditary traits to survive; he must learn to be wild to become wild, according to Tina Gianquitto. He learns that in a world where "the club and the fang" are law, where the law of the pack rules and a good-natured dog such as Curly can be torn to pieces by pack members, survival by whatever means is paramount.

London also explores the idea of "nature vs. nurture". Buck, raised as a pet, is by heredity a wolf. The change of environment brings up his innate characteristics and strengths to the point where he fights for survival and becomes the leader of the pack. Pizer describes how the story reflects human nature in its prevailing theme of strength, particularly in the face of harsh circumstances.

The veneer of civilization is thin and fragile, writes Doctorow, and London exposes the brutality at the core of humanity and the ease with which humans revert to a state of primitivism. His interest in Marxism is evident in the sub-theme that humanity is motivated by materialism, and his interest in Nietzschean philosophy is shown by Buck's characterization. Gianquitto writes that in Buck's characterization, London created a type of Nietzschean Übermensch – in this case a dog that reaches mythic proportions.

Doctorow sees the story as a caricature of a bildungsroman – in which a character learns and grows – in that Buck becomes progressively less civilized. Gianquitto explains that Buck has evolved to the point that he is ready to join a wolf pack, which has a social structure uniquely adapted to and successful in the harsh Arctic environment, unlike humans, who are weak in the harsh environment.

Writing style 

The first chapter opens with the first quatrain of John Myers O'Hara's poem, Atavism, published in 1902 in The Bookman. The stanza outlines one of the main motifs of The Call of the Wild: that Buck when removed from the "sun-kissed" Santa Clara Valley where he was raised, will revert to his wolf heritage with its innate instincts and characteristics.

The themes are conveyed through London's use of symbolism and imagery which, according to Labor, vary in the different phases of the story. The imagery and symbolism in the first phase, to do with the journey and self-discovery, depict physical violence, with strong images of pain and blood. In the second phase, fatigue becomes a dominant image and death is a dominant symbol, as Buck comes close to being killed. The third phase is a period of renewal and rebirth and takes place in the spring, before ending with the fourth phase, when Buck fully reverts to nature and is placed in a vast and "weird atmosphere", a place of pure emptiness.

The setting is allegorical. The southern lands represent the soft, materialistic world; the northern lands symbolize a world beyond civilization and are inherently competitive. The harshness, brutality, and emptiness in Alaska reduce life to its essence, as London learned, and it shows in Buck's story. Buck must defeat Spitz, the dog who symbolically tries to get ahead and take control. When Buck is sold to Charles, Hal, and Mercedes, he finds himself in a dirty camp. They treat their dogs badly; they are artificial interlopers in the pristine landscape. Conversely, Buck's next masters, John Thornton and his two companions are described as "living close to the earth". They keep a clean camp, treat their animals well, and represent man's nobility in nature. Unlike Buck, Thornton loses his fight with his fellow species, and not until Thornton's death does Buck revert fully to the wild and his primordial state.

The characters too are symbolic of types. Charles, Hal, and Mercedes symbolize vanity and ignorance, while Thornton and his companions represent loyalty, purity, and love. Much of the imagery is stark and simple, with an emphasis on images of cold, snow, ice, darkness, meat, and blood.

London varied his prose style to reflect the action. He wrote in an over-affected style in his descriptions of Charles, Hal, and Mercedes' camp as a reflection of their intrusion into the wilderness. Conversely, when describing Buck and his actions, London wrote in a style that was pared down and simple—a style that would influence and be the forebear of Hemingway's style.

The story was written as a frontier adventure and in such a way that it worked well as a serial. As Doctorow points out, it is good episodic writing that embodies the style of magazine adventure writing popular in that period. "It leaves us with satisfaction at its outcome, a story well and truly told," he said.

Reception and legacy 

The Call of the Wild was enormously popular from the moment it was published. H. L. Mencken wrote of London's story: "No other popular writer of his time did any better writing than you will find in The Call of the Wild." A reviewer for The New York Times wrote of it in 1903: "If nothing else makes Mr. London's book popular, it ought to be rendered so by the complete way in which it will satisfy the love of dog fights apparently inherent in every man." The reviewer for The Atlantic Monthly wrote that it was a book: "untouched by bookishness...The making and the achievement of such a hero [Buck] constitute, not a pretty story at all, but a very powerful one."

The book secured London a place in the canon of American literature. The first printing of 10,000 copies sold out immediately; it is still one of the best-known stories written by an American author and continues to be read and taught in schools. It has been published in 47 languages. London's first success, the book secured his prospects as a writer and gained him a readership that stayed with him throughout his career.

After the success of The Call of the Wild, London wrote to Macmillan in 1904 proposing a second book (White Fang) in which he wanted to describe the opposite of Buck: a dog that transforms from wild to tame: "I'm going to reverse the process...Instead of devolution of decivilization ... I'm going to give the evolution, the civilization of a dog."

Adaptations
 The 1923 adaptation of London's story was a silent film. 
 The 1935 version, starring Clark Gable and Loretta Young, expanded John Thornton's role and was the first "talkie" to feature the story. 
 The 1972 movie The Call of the Wild, starring Charlton Heston as John Thornton, was filmed in Finland.  
 The 1976 television film The Call of the Wild starred John Beck. 
 The 1978 Snoopy TV special What a Nightmare, Charlie Brown! is another adaptation. 
 A 1980 Unabridged Audio-book adaptation was done by Recorded Books LLC (#80110) (3 audio-cassettes, 4.5 hours playing time) Well-done narration by Frank Muller. Cover Illustration by Wendell Minor. <Source: physical copy of the audio book>
 In 1981 an anime film titled Call of the Wild: Howl Buck was released, starring Mike Reynolds and Bryan Cranston. 
 In 1983-1984 Hungarian comics artist Imre Sebök made a comic book adaptation of Call of the Wild, which was also translated into German.  
 The 1997 adaptation called The Call of the Wild: Dog of the Yukon starred Rutger Hauer and was narrated by Richard Dreyfuss. The Hollywood Reporter said that Graham Ludlow's adaptation was, "... a pleasant surprise.  Much more faithful to Jack London's 1903 classic than the two Hollywood versions." 
 In 1998 a comic adaptation had been made for Boys' Life magazine. Out of cultural sensitivities, the Yeehat Native Americans are omitted, and John Thornton's killers are now white criminals who, as before, are also killed by Buck.
 The 2000 television adaptation was released on Animal Planet. It ran for a single season of 13 episodes and was released on DVD in 2010 as a feature film.
 The 2020 film The Call of the Wild, a live-action/computer-animated film, starred Harrison Ford, and Terry Notary provides the motion-capture performance for Buck the dog, with the canine character then brought to life by MPC’s animators.

References

Bibliography

Further reading
Fusco, Richard. "On Primitivism in The Call of the Wild. American Literary Realism, 1870–1910. Vol. 20, No. 1 (Fall, 1987), pp. 76–80
 McCrum, Robert. The 100 best novels: No 35 – The Call of the Wild by Jack London (1903) "The 100 best novels: No 35 – The Call of the Wild by Jack London (1903)".] The Guardian''. 19 May 2014. Retrieved 5 September 2015.

External links 

 
 
 

 
1903 American novels
American adventure novels
American novels adapted into films
Fiction about animal cruelty
Klondike Gold Rush in fiction
Novels about dogs
Novels adapted into comics
Novels by Jack London
Novels first published in serial form
Novels set in Yukon
Works originally published in The Saturday Evening Post